Theresa Williams (born 1956) is a contemporary fiction writer whose works include The Secret of Hurricanes:  A Novel (MacAdam/Cage 2002) and short stories in such magazines and journals as The Sun, The Chattahoochee Review, and Hunger Mountain.  She is the recipient of an Individual Excellence Award from the Ohio Arts Council and her novel, The Secret of Hurricanes was a finalist for the Paterson Fiction Prize.  She teaches literature and creative writing at Bowling Green State University in Ohio.

References

1956 births
Living people
21st-century American novelists
American women novelists
21st-century American women writers
20th-century American novelists
20th-century American women writers
Bowling Green State University faculty
American women academics